Gümüşler (literally "silvers") is a Turkish word that may refer to the following places in Turkey:

 Gümüşler, Niğde, a town in Niğde Province
 Gümüşler Monastery, in the town
 Gümüşler Dam, near the town
 Gümüşler, Yenice

See also
 Gümüş (disambiguation), "silver"